The East Cactus Plain Wilderness is a  wilderness area on the Cactus Plain  north of Bouse, Arizona. It is one of twenty-five wilderness areas located in the Lower Colorado River Valley region, south of Lake Mead–Hoover Dam. It is administered by the Bureau of Land Management.

See also
 List of LCRV Wilderness Areas (Colorado River)
 List of Arizona Wilderness Areas

References

External links
 East Cactus Plain Wilderness – Wilderness.net
 Cactus Plain Wilderness Study Area – BLM

Wilderness areas within the Lower Colorado River Valley
Protected areas of the Mojave Desert
Wilderness areas of Arizona
Cactus Plain Wilderness, East
Cactus Plain Wilderness, East
Landforms of La Paz County, Arizona
Bureau of Land Management areas in Arizona
Protected areas established in 1990
1990 establishments in Arizona